Ralf Gathmann (born June 4, 1965) is a German entrepreneur. Gathmann is the chief executive officer of CORYS, which supplies training and engineering simulators to Transportation, Power, Oil&Gas and Chemical industries. He is also the chairman of the board of Corys Inc (USA), Corys India Simulation Systems Pvt Ltd (India),HKD (China), HyperionRsi Simulation (Cyprus). He holds a master's degree in Physics and a Ph.D. degree in engineering mechanics.

Career
In 1993, Gathmann joined Corys R & D. He did well working in the company and two years later, in 1995, he became a Deputy Technical Director. Later he took the position of Director of the Rail Sector Business Unit and since 2003, he held the position of Deputy Chief Operating Officer. Ralf Gathmann is appointed as a Managing Director of Corys  in 2008.

He developed the rail business and boosted its international expansion, before joining the operational management, the general management and then the positions of CEO in 2009.

In 2000, Ralf Gathmann was appointed to Rail Training International Limited. He worked there until 2007.

Corys
Corys is a French company based in Grenoble, is a world reference in training and engineering simulators.

See also
 Corys
 Grenoble

References

External links
Official website

German businesspeople in transport
Living people
1965 births